USS Springfield may refer to the following ships of the United States Navy:

  was a sternwheel steamboat in use during the American Civil War.
  was a steamboat chartered during 1918 and 1919.
  was a light cruiser commissioned in 1944, and later converted to a guided-missile cruiser serving until 1974
  is a  nuclear attack submarine commissioned in 1993 and currently in active service

United States Navy ship names